Elmwood High School may refer to:
Elmwood High School (Elmwood, Illinois)
Elmwood High School (Bloomdale, Ohio)
Elmwood High School (Elmwood, Wisconsin)

See also
 Elmwood School (disambiguation)